The 2002 FIBA Africa Under-18 Championship was the 13th U-18 FIBA Africa championship, played under the auspices of the Fédération Internationale de Basketball, the world basketball sport governing body. The tournament was held from August 2–9, 2002 at the Indoor Sport Hall of the Cairo Stadium in Cairo, Egypt, contested by 9 national teams and won by Nigeria.

The tournament qualified the winner and the runner-up for the 2003 FIBA Under-19 World Championship.

Format
The 12 teams were divided into two groups (Groups A+B) for the preliminary round.
Round robin for the preliminary round; the top two teams from each group advanced to the semifinals.
From there on a knockout system was used until the final.

Squads

Draw

Preliminary round

Group A

Group B

Knockout stage 
Championship bracket

7th place match

5th place match

Semifinals

Bronze medal game

Gold medal game

Final standings

Awards

References 

2002
2002 in African basketball
2002 in Egyptian sport
International basketball competitions hosted by Egypt